German-based No Angels, one of the most successful acts in German music history, are an all-female pop band formed in 2000 on the debut season of the German adaption of the talent series Popstars. Originally a quintet, consisting of band members Nadja Benaissa, Lucy Diakovska, Sandy Mölling, Vanessa Petruo, and Jessica Wahls, they were one of the first television-cast acts to achieve continued success throughout Central Europe in the early 2000s. No Angels made their debut with Elle'ments (2001). Cheyenne Records consulted a small team of German-based musicians to work with the quintet on the album, including Thorsten Brötzmann, Peter Ries, Leslie Mándoki, and Peter Plate. Most of them would become frequent collaborators on subsequent projects Now... Us! (2002) and Pure (2003). Beginning with their second album Now... Us!, the band took a wider role in contributing own lyrics and melodies to their music, with Petruo co-writing the number-one single "Something About Us." At the same time, the group sourced songs from a growing number of international songwriters, particularly from Australia, Scandinavia, and the United Kingdom.

Released songs

Live songs
 "Baby Can I Hold You" – Rivers of Joy Tour, 2001
 "Fernando" – Die ultimative Chart Show, 2003
 "Genio Atrapado" – Rivers of Joy Tour, 2001
 "If Your Girl Only Knew"/"Try Again" (Aaliyah Medley) – Rivers of Joy Tour, 2001
 "River Deep - Mountain High" – Rivers of Joy Tour, 2001
 "You Are Everything" – Rivers of Joy Tour, 2001

Unreleased songs
These songs were recorded by No Angels but remain unreleased:

See also
 No Angels discography

References

External links
NoAngels-Music.de — official website.

No Angels